Lysianka is an urban-type settlement located in Zvenyhorodka Raion of Cherkasy Oblast (province) in central Ukraine. It hosts the administration of Lysianka settlement hromada, one of the hromadas of Ukraine. Population: 

Until 18 July 2020, Lysianka served as an administrative center of Lysianka Raion. The raion was abolished in July 2020 as part of the administrative reform of Ukraine, which reduced the number of raions of Cherkasy Oblast to four. The area of Lysianka Raion was merged into Zvenyhorodka Raion.

References

External links
 
 

Urban-type settlements in Zvenyhorodka Raion
Populated places established in 1593
Cossack Hetmanate